Mulena Yomuhulu Mbumu wa Litunga Selumelume Muimui (or Silumelume) was a Chief of Barotseland in Africa.

Family and life
Silumelume was a son of the King Mulambwa Santulu and thus grandson of King Mwanawina I.

Lozi people believed that he was a descendant of god Nyambe.

He became a king in 1835 after his father died, but his brother Mubukwanu was not pleased with that.

Death 
Silumelume was in fact chosen by the nation's council, but he was soon assassinated, perhaps on the instructions of his brother, who thereupon succeeded him.

He was killed by Mwene Siengale during a session of the Khotla and was buried at Namaweshi.

Children 
His wife is unknown, but his children were Maselokwa and Kutauka (gender unknown).

Sources 

Makololo interregnum and the legacy of David Livingstone (PDF)

Litungas
19th-century monarchs in Africa